One Big Happy is an American sitcom television series produced by Ellen DeGeneres starring Kelly Brook, Nick Zano and Elisha Cuthbert, about a gay woman, Lizzy, who is pregnant with her best friend Luke's baby, while he is in love with another woman, Prudence. The show was created by Liz Feldman, and it premiered on March 17, 2015. Six episodes were ordered by NBC.

On May 8, 2015, NBC cancelled the series after one season. It was produced by Visualized, Inc., in association with A Very Good Production and Warner Bros. Television.

Cast
Elisha Cuthbert as Lizzy
Nick Zano as Luke
Kelly Brook as Prudence
Rebecca Corry as Leisha
Chris Williams as Roy
Brandon Mychal Smith as Marcus

Episodes

Reception
One Big Happy received generally negative reviews from critics. At Metacritic (which assigns a weighted mean—out of 100—based on reviews from mainstream critics) the show received a weighted mean score of 37 from 21 reviews.

References

External links

2015 American television series debuts
2015 American television series endings
NBC original programming
2010s American sitcoms
American LGBT-related sitcoms
Pregnancy-themed television shows
Television shows set in California
Television series by Warner Bros. Television Studios
Television series by A Very Good Production